Barnett Lake is a small lake  southwest of I-95 in Brevard County, Florida. This lake, in the River Lakes Conservation Area, has no park areas or public swimming beaches. It has no road access.

References

Lakes of Brevard County, Florida